Chiche is a surname. Notable people with the surname include:

 Guillaume Chiche (born 1986), French politician
 Marina Chiche (born 1981) French classical violinist
 Sophie Chiche, American life strategist, journalist, psychologist, and author

See also
 Chiché (disambiguation)